The 2014 Tennessee State Tigers football team represented Tennessee State University as a member of the Ohio Valley Conference (OVC) in the 2014 NCAA Division I FCS football season. They were led by fifth-year head coach Rod Reed and played their home games at LP Field and at Hale Stadium. Tennessee State finished the season 6–6 overall and 3–5 in OVC play to tie for sixth place.

Schedule

Ranking movements

References

Tennessee State
Tennessee State Tigers football seasons
Tennessee State Tigers football